Brilliant is a 2004 Canadian thriller film directed by Roger Cardinal, and starring Erika Eleniak and Bruce Boxleitner.

Plot
Elizabeth Braden (Deborah Kelly) is a promising medical student working with renowned neurosurgeon, Dr. Dietrich (Boxleitner) on a high-tech research facility. Their work consists of finding a drug that would enhance memory. However, Elizabeth wakes up one day realizing that seven days have been stolen from her own memory. To find out what happened, she seeks the help of her friend, Ricky (Eleniak) and her lover, Joel (Matthew Boylan). But she soon realizes that there is nobody she can trust.

Filming
The film was shot through several locations on Quebec, Canada. Some of the locations used for the film were John Abbott College, Sainte-Anne-de-Bellevue, and Mirabel International Airport in Montreal, Oka Beach in Oka, and the city of Mirabel.

Cast
 Erika Eleniak as Ricky Smith
 Bruce Boxleitner as Dr. Dietrich

Release
The film was released in Canada on February 15, 2004 and on March 28, 2004 on the United States.

External links
 

2004 films
2004 thriller films
Canadian thriller films
English-language Canadian films
Films shot in Quebec
2000s thriller films
2000s English-language films
2000s Canadian films